Gregory Shantha Kumar Francis (B.Th., PGDip.P&CC), was an Anglican Bishop of Kurunegala, Sri Lanka.

Gregory Shantha Kumar Francis was born in 1955 in the village of Polgahawela, Sri Lanka. He is an upcountry Tamil, and fluent in Sinhala, English and Tamil.

Francis was appointed as deacon in 1978, receiving his Bachelor of Theology from the University of Serampore the same year. In 1980 he obtained a postgraduate diploma in pastoral and clinical counselling from Nawa Jeewana Institute of Psychology, Colombo and was ordained as a priest in the Church of Ceylon. He was the chaplain at Hillwood College, Kandy (1993–2000), Trinity College, Kandy (2001–2004). Francis also obtained a higher diploma in comprehensive drug abuse prevention and counselling from the Anti Narcotic Association of Sri Lanka.

On 7 November 2010 Rowan Williams, Archbishop of Canterbury, appointed Francis as the fifth Bishop of Kurunegala in the Church of Ceylon, succeeding retired Bishop Kumara Illangasinghe.

In 2012, Francis was nominated by the International Counter Narcotic Association to be a consultant on rehabilitation and counselling.

On 6 January 2015 the Archbishop of Canterbury, Justin Welby, announced that Francis had resigned as Bishop of Kurunegala. In a statement by Francis he advised that he had been threatened by Tamil diaspora groups opposing his stand for a unitary state and the sovereignty of the country.

Francis is married to Priyadharshin and has two sons, Prabath and Pramith.

References

External links
 The Church of Ceylon (Anglican Communion)
 Anglican Church of Ceylon News
 Worship Resources including a Prayer for Sri Lanka written by Metropolitan Lakdasa de Mel

20th-century Anglican bishops in Asia
Sri Lankan Anglican bishops
Sri Lankan educational theorists
Sri Lankan chaplains
Anglican chaplains
Sri Lankan Tamil priests
Anglican bishops of Kurunegala
1955 births
Living people